ITPC may refer to:

 International Tech Park, Chennai, a high-tech park in Taramani district of Chennai, India
 Iraqi Telecommunications and Post Company, a government-owned and operated corporation responsible for providing telecommunication and mail services in Iraq
 ITPC, an application protocol used by iTunes for podcasts
 ITPC : IT Project Circle of Bharat Sanchar Nigam Limited